The  is a commuter electric multiple unit (EMU) train type operated by the private railway operator Keisei Electric Railway in the Tokyo area of Japan since 1991.

Operations
, the six-car sets are used solely on the Keisei Main Line.

Formations
, the fleet consists of 10 eight-car sets and three six-car sets. The sets are formed as follows, with car 1 at the Narita Airport end.

6-car sets
Six-car sets 3828 and 3838 are formed as shown below, with four motored ("M") cars and two non-powered trailer ("T") cars.

The two M1 cars are each fitted with two single-arm pantographs.

Set 3748 
Six-car set 3748 is formed as shown below.

8-car sets
The eight-car sets are formed as shown below, with six motored ("M") cars and two non-powered trailer ("T") cars.

The two M1 cars are each fitted with two pantographs, and the M1' car is fitted with one pantograph (cross-arm type for sets 3708 to 3818 and single-arm type for sets 3848 to 3868).

Interior

Seating consists of longitudinal bench seating throughout.

History
The first 3700 series sets were introduced in 1991, replacing the original 3000 series trains. The first six-car sets were delivered in 2000. Sets from the 6th batch onward (set 3828 onward) had restyled front ends with the headlights located near the roof. Two eight-car sets (3808 and 3748) were leased to the Hokuso Railway becoming Hokuso 7300 series sets 7808 and 7818, supplementing the two 7300 series sets owned by the Hokuso Railway.

In 2017, eight-car set 3738 was converted and renumbered to become Chiba New Town Railway 9800 series set 9808, owned by the Chiba New Town Railway and operated by the Hokuso Railway.

Eight-car set 3778 was transferred to the Hokuso Railway, becoming 7300 series set 7828. The transferred set began revenue service with the Hokuso Railway on 26 February 2018.

In December 2021, eight-car set 3768 was leased to the Hokuso Railway and became 7300 series set 7838. In addition, 7300 series set 7818 was returned to Keisei; it regained its original set number (3748) and was shortened to a six-car formation.

References

External links

 Keisei rolling stock descriptions 

Keisei Electric Railway
Electric multiple units of Japan
Train-related introductions in 1991
Nippon Sharyo multiple units
Tokyu Car multiple units
1500 V DC multiple units of Japan